Fadrique de Toledo or Fadrique Álvarez de Toledo y Mendoza, 1st Marquess of Valdueza (Naples, 30 May 1580 – Madrid, 11 December 1634), was a Spanish noble and admiral.
He was a Knight of the Order of Santiago and Captain General of the Spanish Navy at the age of 37.

Life
He was born in Naples as the son of Pedro de Toledo Osorio, 5th Marquess of Villafranca, then commander in chief of the Spanish Army in the Kingdom of Naples, and Doña Elvira de Mendoza.

He served in the Spanish fleet under command of his father and rose quickly through the ranks, as did his elder brother García de Toledo Osorio, 6th Marquess of Villafranca. In 1617, he became Captain General of the Ocean Sea Navy, replacing the late Admiral Luis Fajardo.

He gained several victories against the Dutch, in 1621 near Gibraltar and in 1623 in the English Channel, blockading the Dutch coast. In the same year he defeated a Moorish incursion near Gibraltar.

In 1625 he was appointed General of Portugal (then in a personal union with Spain), and  Capitán General of the Army of Brazil. He sailed towards Brazil at the head of a fleet consisting of 34 Spanish ships, 22 Portuguese ships and 12,566 men (three quarters were Spanish and the rest Portuguese). There he reconquered the strategically important city of Salvador da Bahia from the Dutch on 30 April 1625.

This victory would prove decisively important in the Dutch-Portuguese War to oust the Dutch from Brazil over the next two decades.

In 1629 he commanded a Spanish expedition that expelled the English and French colonial settlers from the islands of Saint Kitts and Nevis.

For all of his victories he was awarded the title of Marquess of Villanueva de Valdueza on 17 January 1624.

Marriage and children 

On 12 August 1627, in Madrid, Don Fadrique married his cousin Doña Elvira Ponce de León, daughter of Don Luis Ponce de León, VI Marqués de Zahara, and Doña Victoria Álvarez de Toledo.

They had three children :
 Doña Elvira de Toledo, married Don Juan Gaspar Enríquez de Cabrera, 6th Duke of Medina de Rioseco.
 Doña Victoria de Toledo, married her cousin Don Francisco Ponce de León, 5th Duke of Arcos.
 Don Fadrique Álvarez de Toledo Ponce de León, 2nd Marquess of Valdueza, 7th Marquess de Villafranca and Grandee of Spain.

Don Fadrique also had two illegitimate children:
  
 Pedro Álvarez de Toledo, Abbot of the Royal Monastery of  Alcalá la Real, Jaén.
 Íñigo de Toledo, who married Leonor de Velasco, XI Countess of Siruela.

External links 
Don Fadrique de Toledo y Osorio (in Spanish)

References

Marquesses of Spain
Spanish politicians
Captain generals of the Navy
Fadrique Alvarez de Toledo y Mendoza
1580 births
1634 deaths
Spanish admirals
Spanish generals
Military personnel from Naples
Knights of Santiago
Naval commanders of the Eighty Years' War
People of the Dutch–Portuguese War
People of the Anglo-Spanish War (1625–1630)
Nobility from Naples